The Schinhorn is a mountain of the Bernese Alps, located west of the Aletschhorn in the canton of Valais. It lies between the valleys of Lötschental (north) and Oberaletsch (south).

See also
List of mountains of Switzerland

References

External links
 Schinhorn on Hikr

Mountains of the Alps
Alpine three-thousanders
Mountains of Switzerland
Mountains of Valais
Bernese Alps